Woodilee may refer to:

Woodilee Hospital, psychiatric institution in Lenzie, East Dunbartonshire, Scotland
Woodilee Village, village in East Dunbartonshire. Scotland